Calvary Baptist Academy is a private co-educational school located in Shreveport, Louisiana, United States. The school's enrollment is approximately 600 students, K–12th grade.

Athletics
Calvary Baptist athletics competes in the LHSAA.

Championships
Football championships
(3) State Championships: 2013, 2014, 2020

Notable alumni
Sam Burns (2015 graduate), professional golfer
Shea Patterson (transferred after junior year), NFL player
Greedy Williams, NFL player
Rodarius Williams, NFL player
Brandon Wilson, NFL player

Notable staff
Victoria Leonardo, mixed martial artist; Spanish teacher
Doug Pederson, former NFL head coach of the Philadelphia Eagles; coached the football team from 2005 to 2008
Todd Walker, MLB player and college basketball player; coached baseball at Calvary Baptist Academy from 2013 to 2015

References

External links
 Official school website

High schools in Shreveport, Louisiana
Private high schools in Louisiana
Private middle schools in Louisiana
Private elementary schools in Louisiana